Pigadia is a settlement in the Vistonida municipal unit, Xanthi regional unit of Greece. It is located north of Genisea and approximately 9 kilometers southeast of Xanthi. The population of Pigadia was 567 inhabitants in 1981 and 634 inhabitants in 1991.

External links

Greek Travel Pages - Pigadia

Populated places in Xanthi (regional unit)